Dirty Ron/Ghost Songs is a double album by Tim Rogers and the Temperance Union. The album was released on 5 September 2005 as a double album and peaked at number 48 on the ARIA Albums Chart.

Singles
"Do It Again" was released as a radio single. All tracks written by Tim Rogers with exception of 'Simple Things' by Tim Rogers/Ian Kitney.

Track listing
Dirty Ron
"Do It Again" – 4:09
"My Brother's Room" – 3:12
"I's Rather Be Krund" – 3:53
"Rats" – 2:16
"Kickin' Stones" – 3:58
"Shit" – 2:29
"Kalgoorlie" – 4:09
"Simple Things" – 2:53
"Who You Settin' Your House Up For?" – 3:33
"The Singer-Songwriter Blues" – 3:36

Ghost Songs
"Dumb" – 2:12
"Wild One" – 4:42
"Obviously" – 3:57
"Ghost Songs" – 4:14
"Broken Stuff" – 3:07
"Ridin' Between My Place and Ours" – 3:26
"Social Pages" – 3:18
"Paperboy" – 4:14
"Tonight" – 6:00

Personnel
Tim Rogers – guitar, vocals
Shane O'Mara – guitar
Ian Kitney – drums, percussion
Stuart Speed – bass guitar
Donna Simpson – vocals ("Tonight"), backing vocals (Broken Stuff)
Rebecca Barnard – backing vocals (I's Rather Be Krund, Social Pages)
Missy Higgins – backing vocals (Ghost Songs, Paperboy)

Charts

References

2005 albums
Tim Rogers albums